The Hunt is a 2007 film directed by Fritz Kiersch. It stars Joe Michael Burke and Cliff De Young and is about two hunters and a boy who, while on a hunting trip, discover aliens.

Cast
Joe Michael Burke as Jack 
Cliff De Young as John Kraw
Mitchell Burns as Clint
Robert Rusler as Atticus Monroe
Amy Briede as Tessa Kraw

References

External links

2007 films
Films directed by Fritz Kiersch
2000s thriller films
2000s English-language films